Dukowski is a surname. Notable people with the surname include:

Albin Dukowski (born 1954), Canadian sprinter
Chuck Dukowski (born 1954), American musician, stage name of Gary Arthur McDaniel
L. S. Dukowski (1900–1976), Canadian ice hockey player